OnePager Pro is a project management software package published by Chronicle Graphics, Inc., based in Denver, Colorado. OnePager Pro is primarily designed as a project presentation and reporting tool, creating Gantt charts, timelines, and schedule summaries based on data from other project management software such as Microsoft Project. In 2012, the company trademarked the term "Gantt Art" to describe the visuals that OnePager Pro creates.

Features 
 Creating presentation-ready Gantt charts
 Conditional formatting of Microsoft Project schedules
 Summarizing one or multiple project plans
 Dynamically grouping and sorting tasks in a project schedules
 Tracking project changes over time with versioned snapshots
 Showing dependencies between project tasks and milestones

Product History 
OnePager Pro was first released in 2007, originally as a lighter version of Chronicle Graphics' TimeArrow project analysis software. OnePager Pro contained all of the visualization capabilities of TimeArrow, but none of the more in-depth analysis capabilities. OnePager Pro grew rapidly in popularity, eventually surpassing the install base of TimeArrow. In 2010, Chronicle Graphics sunset the TimeArrow product and began transitioning all of its customers to OnePager Pro.

Chronicle Graphics releases a new version of OnePager Pro approximately once per year, with OnePager Pro 7.1 coming out in early 2022. Between major releases, OnePager Pro users also receive minor updates several times per year based on input from the user community.

OnePager Pro is primarily used by project managers and schedulers in the pharmaceutical and aerospace industries, though numerous financial services firms and federal government agencies have also standardized on the software. OnePager Pro is widely used in the United States, Canada and other English speaking countries, though there is a Japanese-language version of the software available in Japan as well.

Other Editions 
OnePager Bundle, released in 2022, offers support for multiple project management platforms, with direct connections to Smartsheet and Primavera P6 in addition to Microsoft Project and Excel.

OnePager Express, released in 2009, is designed for project managers who manage their projects in Excel, though it is also commonly used to interface with other project management software such as Planisware, Wrike, and Jira, among others.

Reviews 
OnePager Pro has been reviewed by Tactical Project Management, PM Network, Bright Hub, and Webucator, among others.

References

External links 
 OnePager Gantt Chart Software

Project management software
2007 software
Business software for Windows